Arvid Franzen (1899–1961) was a Swedish-born accordionist and bandleader, whose live performances and numerous recordings made him a household name in Scandinavian communities throughout the United States.

Career
A native of Gothenburg, Sweden, Franzen settled in the New York City area and fronted a large ensemble that performed on stage and at dances and social events for over four decades until his death in 1961.

Accordion pioneer Pietro Frosini played many concerts with Franzen  and as a token of his esteem gave him an autographed  photo with the following inscription: "To my 'old pal' Franzen with my greatest admiration for his efforts to place the accordion before the public in an artistic manner."

Recordings
Franzen's first recordings were made in 1919, and over the years his music was released on the Colonial, Columbia, Scandinavian, Standard and Victor labels. Many of the records featured two accordions, and his long list of duet partners included Eric Berg, Walter Eriksson, Harold Freeman, Ture Gadde, Einar Holt, Eddie Jahrl, John Lager and Ragnar Sundquist. Franzen also toured with accordionists Eric Olson and Ragnar Sundquist and with the comedian Hjalmar Peterson.

Between 1927 and 1929 the Hjalmar Peterson Orchestra released eighteen instrumental tracks on Victor Records. Peterson's own band did not appear on the records, which were made by studio musicians in New York and Chicago. Among the session players were country music singer Carson Robison on guitar and Arvid Franzen on accordion.

In 1929 Franzen played on six Hjalmar Peterson recordings and on six Hjalmar Peterson Orchestra recordings. The same year he was a guest artist with Peterson's traveling company of singers, dancers and musicians on a tour of the Upper Midwest. The newspaper in Bagley, Minnesota wrote of an upcoming visit by "Arvid Franzen, the celebrated accordion artist, whose Victor and Columbia records are found in tens of thousands of Scandinavian homes."

Fifty years after his death Franzen's recordings are still sold by vintage music stores and online retailers. They can also be found at video-sharing websites and other digital archives.  In 2011 the Library of Congress opened its National Jukebox website with streaming audio for fourteen songs by Arvid Franzen.

Gallery

References

External links
Book excerpt
A Passion for Polka at the University of California Press.
Eddie Jahrl in a A Passion for Polka
Historic American Newspapers
Arvid Franzen
Image files
Photo inscribed by Pietro Frosini to Arvid Franzen
Arvid Franzen and Walter Eriksson
Discographies
Arvid Franzen on Victor Records.
Franzen-Holt Instrumental Quartet on Victor Records.
Eric Berg on Victor Records.
Einar Holt on Victor Records.
Eddie Jahrl on Victor Records.
Eric Olson on Victor Records.
Swedish music and film
Arvid Franzen
Arvid Franzen on Standard Records
Eric Berg
Eddie Jahrl
John Lager
Eric Olson (Olzen)
Streaming audio at the Library of Congress
Arvid Franzen
Eric Berg
John Lager
Streaming audio at the Internet Archive
Arvid Franzen
Scandinavian old-time 
On tour with Olle i Skratthult 
Video
.

1961 deaths
American accordionists
American bandleaders
Columbia Records artists
People from Gothenburg
Swedish accordionists
Swedish emigrants to the United States
Swedish migration to North America
Victor Records artists
1899 births
20th-century American conductors (music)
20th-century accordionists